Kenneth E. Lee (born February 11, 1961, in  Muncy, Pennsylvania) is a former Republican member of the Pennsylvania House of Representatives.

References

Republican Party members of the Pennsylvania House of Representatives
Living people
1961 births